KMNB (102.9 MHz, "The Wolf") is an American commercial FM radio station in Minneapolis-St. Paul that carries a country radio format. KMNB is owned by Audacy, Inc. Its main transmitter is located on the KMSP Tower in Shoreview, Minnesota, with backup facilities on the nearby Telefarm installation.  The station's studios are located on Second Avenue South in Downtown Minneapolis.

History

Early years as WCCO-FM
The station began as WCCO-FM in 1969.  It was the FM counterpart of local powerhouse WCCO, owned by Midwest Communications.  As the station was hampered by its limited signal of only 2,700 watts,  it had to temporarily transmit from the Foshay Tower at reduced power pending the completion of the Telefarm tower facility in Shoreview. It carried programming separate from the AM, with a mix of Beautiful Music and MOR album cuts and soft vocals, not unlike the pre-rock KQRS. The station later added two DJ shifts separate from the AM, hosted by Denny Long and Lou Lattson, playing a free-form rock music format, which included some underground rock tracks, along with full-service elements such as news and weather.

Until 1973, the station only operated for the minimum amount of time required to keep the license.  In August 1973, when the transmitter was upgraded to full power at 100,000 watts, a broad-based music format was launched. By 1975, the format evolved to adult contemporary music, though WCCO-FM continued to play deeper album tracks than most AC stations.  In that same year, WCCO-FM picked up the syndicated "Dr. Demento Show" for weekends. Personalities included Paul Stagg, Carl Lensgraf, Terri Davis, Tom Ambrose, Curt Lundgren, Johnny Canton, Peter May and Pat O'Neill. Tim Russell, who went on to be a cast member on NPR's "A Prairie Home Companion," hosted middays and created memorable characters like traffic reporter "Captain Buzz Studley."

Switch to Top 40
WCCO-FM was a modestly successful station until new IDS Center transmitters for competing stations were built in 1979.  That caused interference to WCCO-FM's broadcast signal. In addition to the interference, the station was affected by a strike at about the same time. The striking FM air staff was temporarily replaced with announcers with little experience, making the station sound unpolished compared to its usual presentation. The station also began to face formidable competition after a relaunch of KSTP-FM "KS95," with a comparable live AC format.  The station gravitated to a stricter playlist as the 1980s wore on.

In 1983, Top 40 became a very popular format across the country.  WLOL, which picked up the format by 1982, was one of the most successful stations in the market, and KDWB had moved from AM to the FM band.  WCCO-FM also made the switch to Top 40 under Program Director John Long that year. However, results were dismal, and both the format and Long lasted just a few months.

WLTE (1983-2011)

The "Lite" format was introduced later in 1983, along with new call letters WLTE.  In addition to the soft adult contemporary format, the station switched to all-Christmas music from mid-November to midnight on Christmas, billing itself in that period as "The Official Christmas Music Station". Rival Kool 108, an oldies station, also programs nothing but Christmas music during this period.

In 1998, the ownership of WLTE, along with sister station WCCO, went to the Infinity Broadcasting Corporation, a subsidiary of CBS Radio.

Until the early 2000s, the station had been known as "W-Lite" and "Lite Rock 103 FM," having rounded the frequency up to "103" since the WCCO-FM days. The frequency approximation worked in the days before digital tuners, and it eliminated confusion with KEEY, on 102.1.  The station became "102.9 Lite FM" in the mid-2000s, as digital tuners became standard on most FM radios, displaying a station's exact dial position.

Country era (2011-present)

In December 2011, WLTE became the subject of format change rumors, amid falling ratings. On December 16, 2011, the station dismissed its entire on-air staff, effective December 23, while also dropping the use of the "Lite FM" moniker, and began promoting "Something Fresh Coming to the Twin Cities."  CBS announced on December 19 that the station would switch to a country music format, to be known as "Buz'n 102.9," effective December 26 at 8:00 a.m. However, 102.9 switched to country at 6:00 p.m. on December 25, about 14 hours earlier than originally planned. The final song on "Lite FM" (and as WLTE) was "Grandma Got Run Over by a Reindeer" by Elmo & Patsy, while the first (and ultimately last) song on "Buz'n" was "My Kinda Party" by Jason Aldean.

On December 26, 2011, WLTE changed its call letters to KMNB to reflect the new branding. WLTE was the last of four CBS Radio stations to drop the AC format in 2011 after March's flip of WIAD in Washington, D.C. from AC to hot adult contemporary (WWFS in New York City followed suit on October 12) and WCFS-FM in Chicago on August 1 that year, when they flipped to all-news to simulcast WBBM.

At the same time as the format flip, the former "Lite FM" AC format moved to co-owned KZJK 104.1-HD2, replacing smooth jazz.

On February 2, 2017, CBS Radio announced it would merge with Entercom. The merger was approved on November 9, 2017, and was consummated on the 17th.

On November 23, 2018, KMNB began running promos pointing to a change on December 3 at 7 a.m., under the tagline 'the Buzz has worn off'. At that time, KMNB rebranded as “102.9 The Wolf”, keeping its country music format, but slightly tweaking it to be include “yesterday’s country hits”.

On March 3, 2020, Entercom and the Minnesota Twins baseball club announced that all games, in addition to being aired on flagship WCCO, would be simulcast on KMNB for the 2020 baseball season.  This arrangement will continue at least through the 2023 season.

HD Radio
KMNB broadcasts using the HD Radio format.  It simulcasts the news/talk format of co-owned AM 830 WCCO on the station's HD2 sub-channel, and formerly aired CBS Sports Radio on its HD3 sub-channel.

References

External links

Radiotapes.com Historic airchecks of Minneapolis/St. Paul radio stations dating back to 1924 including WCCO-FM (including an aircheck from May 1969 when the station first went on the air) and other Twin Cities stations
 TwinCitiesRadioAirchecks.com This site has some recent photos of Glen Olson, Beth Kidd and Johny Canton at the control board and on the air.  The site also has many airchecks of Twin Cities radio from the 1970s, including WCCO-FM, WLTE's predecessor

Country radio stations in the United States
HD Radio stations
Radio stations in Minneapolis–Saint Paul
Radio stations established in 1969
1969 establishments in Minnesota
Audacy, Inc. radio stations